The 2022 All Stars match  was the eleventh annual representative exhibition All Stars match of Australian rugby league. The match was played between the Indigenous All Stars and the Māori All Stars at CommBank Stadium on 12 February 2022. For the first time since the introduction of the All Stars concept, the teams were not selected through public voting.

Men's All Stars match

Teams 

1 - Kotoni Staggs was originally selected to play but withdrew. He was replaced by Brent Naden.
2 - Jack Bird was originally selected to play but withdrew due to injury. He was replaced by Shaquai Mitchell.
3 - Alex Johnston was originally selected to play but withdrew. He was replaced by Tyrell Sloan.
4 - Pasami Saulo was originally selected to play but was withdrawn due to contracting COVID-19. He was replaced by Wiremu Greig.

Result

Women's All Stars match

Teams

Result

References 

2022 NRL season
Rugby league in New South Wales
NRL All Stars match
Sport in Sydney